Humbler may refer to:
 Humility
 Humbler (BDSM), a BDSM device
 Humbler, a controversial commercial for the vacuum operated exhaust (VOE), a short lived device on the 1970 Pontiac GTO